Sriram Balaji and Vishnu Vardhan were the defending champions but chose not to defend their title.

Ivan Gakhov and Alexander Pavlioutchenkov won the title after defeating Saketh Myneni and Vijay Sundar Prashanth 6–4, 6–4 in the final.

Seeds

Draw

References
 Main Draw

Fergana Challenger - Men's Doubles
2018 Doubles